The 1997–98 Auburn Tigers men's basketball team represented Auburn University in the 1997–98 college basketball season. The team's head coach was Cliff Ellis, who was in his fourth season at Auburn. The team played their home games at Beard–Eaves–Memorial Coliseum in Auburn, Alabama. They finished the season 16–14, 7–9 in SEC play. They lost to Florida in the first round of the SEC tournament. They received an invitation to the National Invitation Tournament, where they defeated Southern Miss to advance to the second round where they lost to Marquette.

Roster

Schedule and Results

|-
!colspan=12 style=| Exhibition

|-
!colspan=12 style=| Regular season

|-
!colspan=12 style=| SEC Tournament

|-
!colspan=12 style=| National Invitational Tournament

References

Auburn Tigers men's basketball seasons
Auburn
Auburn
Auburn
Auburn